Steinhorst is a municipality in the district of Gifhorn, in Lower Saxony, Germany. Steinhorst includes the villages of Auermühle, Lüsche, Räderloh and  Steinhorst.

References

Gifhorn (district)